KYOO-FM is a country music radio station licensed to Half Way, Missouri, broadcasting on 99.1 MHz FM. The station is owned by Dennis Benne, through licensee Benne Broadcasting of Bolivar, LLC.

References

External links

Country radio stations in the United States
YOO-FM